The following is a list of awards and nominations received by American actress and producer Laura Dern. Her competitive honors include an Academy Award from three nominations, a British Academy Film Award, a Primetime Emmy Award from eight nominations, and five Golden Globe Awards from eight nominations.

Major associations

Academy Awards
1 win out of 3 nominations

British Academy Film Awards
1 win out of 1 nomination

Primetime Emmy Awards
1 win out of 8 nominations

Golden Globe Awards
5 wins out of 8 nominations

Screen Actors Guild Awards
1 win out of 4 nominations

Critics' awards

Alliance of Women Film Journalists

Atlanta Film Critics Circle

Austin Film Critics Association

Boston Society of Film Critics

Chicago Film Critics Association

Chicago Indie Critics

Columbus Film Critics Association

Critics' Choice Movie Awards

Critics' Choice Television Awards

Dallas–Fort Worth Film Critics Association

Denver Film Critics Society

Detroit Film Critics Society

Florida Film Critics Circle

Georgia Film Critics Association

Greater Western New York Film Critics Association

Hawaii Film Critics Society

Hollywood Critics Association

Houston Film Critics Society

Indiana Film Journalists Association

Indiewire Critics' Poll

Iowa Film Critics Association

Latino Entertainment Journalists Association

London Film Critics Circle

Los Angeles Film Critics Association

Music City Film Critics Association

National Society of Film Critics

New York Film Critics Circle

New York Film Critics Online

North Carolina Film Critics Association

North Dakota Film Society

North Texas Film Critics Association

Oklahoma Film Critics Circle

Online Association of Female Film Critics

Online Film Critics Society

Phoenix Critics Circle

Phoenix Film Critics Society

San Diego Film Critics Society

San Francisco Bay Area Film Critics Circle

Seattle Film Critics Society

Southeastern Film Critics Association

St. Louis Film Critics Association

Toronto Film Critics Association

Vancouver Film Critics Circle

Washington D.C. Area Film Critics Association

Other associations

AARP's Movies for Grown-Up Awards

CableACE Awards

Dingle International Film Festival

Dorian Awards

Gold Derby Television Awards

Hollywood Film Awards

Hollywood Foreign Press Association

Hollywood Walk of Fame

Independent Spirit Awards

Montreal World Film Festival

Satellite Awards

Saturn Awards

Sundance Film Festival

Notes

References

External links
 

Dern, Laura